The Assassination of Jesse James by the Coward Robert Ford is a 2007 American epic revisionist Western film written and directed by Andrew Dominik and starring Brad Pitt as Jesse James. Adapted from Ron Hansen's 1983 novel of the same title, the film dramatizes the relationship between Jesse James and Robert Ford (Casey Affleck), focusing on the events that lead up to the titular killing.

Photography started at August 29, 2005 and ended in December 2005. Filming took place near Calgary, Canmore, and Edmonton, Alberta, and Winnipeg, Manitoba. To achieve the visual style he wanted for the movie, Dominik took influences from many sources, including still photographers, images clipped from magazines, stills from Days of Heaven, and even Polaroids. The original edit of the movie was envisioned by Dominik to be "a dark, contemplative examination of fame and infamy", reaching more than three hours in runtime. This was opposed by the studio and the film was edited repeatedly.

Initially intended for a 2006 release, it was postponed and re-edited for a September 21, 2007, release date. Before it released to theatres, it had its world premiere at the 64th Venice International Film Festival on September 2, 2007. Although a box-office bomb, the film received positive reviews from the critics, with Pitt and Affleck's performances receiving widespread acclaim. It received two nominations at the 80th Academy Awards; Best Cinematography and Best Supporting Actor (for Affleck). It has since gained a large fan following with many of them organizing re-releases of the film under the "Jesse James Revival" banner.

Plot
In 1881, young starstruck Robert "Bob" Ford seeks out Jesse James when the James Gang is planning a train robbery in Blue Cut, Missouri, making unsuccessful attempts to join the gang with the help of his older brother Charley, already a member. The train turns out to be carrying only a fraction of the money originally thought, and a dispirited Frank James leaves the gang and his brother. Jesse returns home to Kansas City, Missouri, bringing the Fords, Dick Liddil and Jesse's cousin, Wood Hite. Jesse sends Charley, Wood, and Dick away, but insists that Bob stay for his help in moving furniture to a new home in St. Joseph, Missouri. Bob becomes more admiring of Jesse before being sent away. He stays at the farmhouse of his widowed sister, Martha Bolton, where he rejoins his brother Charley, Hite, and Liddil.

Liddil reveals to Bob that he is in collusion with another member of the James gang, Jim Cummins, to capture Jesse for a substantial bounty. Meanwhile, Jesse visits another gang member, Ed Miller, who gives away information on Cummins' plot. Jesse kills Miller, then departs with Liddil to hunt down Cummins. Unable to locate him, Jesse viciously beats Albert Ford, a young cousin of Bob and Charley who had hosted him. Later, Liddil stays with Hite at Hite's father's house, where he has sex with Hite's young stepmother. Upon learning of this, Hite tracks Liddil down to Bolton's and holds him at gunpoint, but Bob intervenes, fatally shooting Hite. They dump his body in the woods to conceal the murder from Jesse.

Jesse appears at the Boltons' for dinner, where the Fords deny having seen Liddil recently. At dinner, Jesse mocks Bob for his idolization of him, leading Bob to become less enchanted with and more resentful of Jesse, especially after hearing of what was done to his cousin. Jesse and Charley travel to St. Joseph where Jesse learns of Hite's disappearance, about which Charley denies knowing anything. Meanwhile, Bob goes to Kansas City Police Commissioner Henry Craig, saying he knows Jesse's whereabouts. To prove his allegiance with the James Gang, Bob assists Craig and Sheriff James Timberlake with the arrest of Dick Liddil. Following Liddil's confession to participation in numerous gang robberies, Bob brokers a deal with the Governor of Missouri, Thomas T. Crittenden. He is given ten days to capture or kill Jesse and is promised a substantial bounty and full pardon for Hite's murder.

Charley persuades Jesse to take Bob into the gang; the brothers return to St. Joseph. Introduced as cousins to Jesse's wife and two children, they stay with the family. Jesse wants to revive his gang by committing robberies with the Fords, beginning with the Platte City bank. During their stay, Jesse becomes increasingly suspicious of the brothers, not allowing them to be alone together. However, as the stay passes uneventfully, he later gives Bob a new nickel-plated gun as a token of apology. On the morning of April 3, 1882, as Jesse and the Ford brothers prepare to depart for the robbery, Jesse learns of Liddil's arrest from a newspaper. He suddenly removes his gun belt and climbs a chair to clean a dusty picture. Bob shoots Jesse in the back of the head with the gun given to him before fleeing with Charley. They send a telegram to the governor to announce Jesse's death, for which they were to receive $10,000. However, they never receive more than $500 each.

The Fords try to capitalize on the shooting, starring in a theater show in Manhattan which sees them re-enacting Jesse's murder, but people soon gradually become hostile towards the pair, hailing Jesse as a legend and calling Bob a "coward." The shows are eventually stopped after Bob loses his temper and beats an audience member for mocking him. Guilt-stricken, Charley writes numerous letters to Zee James asking for her forgiveness but never mails any of them. He commits suicide in May 1884. Bob tries to move on with his life, becoming increasingly regretful of his past actions. On June 8, 1892, Bob is murdered by Edward O'Kelley at his saloon in Creede, Colorado. O'Kelley is sentenced to life in prison, but he is pardoned after ten years in 1902.

Cast

Ron Hansen made a cameo as a frontier reporter. The narration was provided by Hugh Ross, an assistant editor on the film.

Production

In March 2004, Warner Bros. and Plan B Entertainment acquired feature film rights to Ron Hansen's 1983 novel The Assassination of Jesse James by the Coward Robert Ford. Andrew Dominik was hired to write and direct the film adaptation. Pitt was considered to portray Jesse James. The role of Ford eventually was between Affleck and Shia LaBeouf; Affleck was cast because it was felt that LaBeouf was too young. Bill Clinton's presidential campaign strategist James Carville was selected to play the Governor of Missouri. By January 2005, Pitt was cast, and filming began on August 29, 2005 in Calgary. Filming also took place in other parts of Alberta, including the McDougall Church in Morley, Alberta,  McKinnon Flats, Heritage Park, the Fairmont Palliser Hotel, the Kananaskis area, several private ranches and the historical Fort Edmonton Park. The historical town of Creede, Colorado was recreated at a cost of $1 million near Goat Creek in Alberta. Filming also took place in Winnipeg in the city's historic Exchange District; the Burton Cummings Theatre (formerly known as The Walker Theatre) and the Pantages Playhouse Theatre, and concluded in December 2005.

The film was initially edited by director Dominik to be "a dark, contemplative examination of fame and infamy," similar to the style of director Terrence Malick. The studio opposed Dominik's approach, preferring less contemplation and more action. One version of the film had a running time of more than three hours. Producers Pitt and Ridley Scott and editors Dylan Tichenor and Michael Kahn collaborated to assemble and test different versions. Tichenor left the production early to cut There Will Be Blood and was replaced by editor Curtis Clayton, who ultimately finished the production. Kahn was brought in for several weeks as the studio's "go to" editor. The test versions did not receive strong scores from test audiences. Despite the negative response, the audiences considered the performances by Pitt and Affleck to be some of their careers' best. Brad Pitt had it written into his contract that the studio could not change the name of the film.

Cinematography
 
One of the most well-known sequences of the film is the scene of a train robbery at nighttime. Cinematographer Roger Deakins used various cinematographic techniques to give the train more of a presence when it was in pitch darkness. The idea was to generate a sense of foreboding atmosphere by using only the lanterns held up by the outlaws and the 5K PAR light mounted on the front of the train In order to enhance the blacks, Deakins did a slight bleach bypass on the negative, which was especially important in terms of rendering detail.

Some scenes in the film have a blurred effect around the borders of the frame. These were achieved by taking old wide-angle lenses and mounting them onto the front of several cameras (Arri Macros in this case). Deakins claimed to have pioneered this technique, naming these combinations of lenses "Deakinizers", which created the effect of vignetting and a slight color aberration around the edges. Deakins recalls:

Several time-lapse sequences appear throughout the film, which were shot by Steadicam operator Damon Moreau. According to Moreau, he was sent to do such shots when the crew was not quite ready to shoot a scene.  These time-lapse sequences were often accompanied by the film's melancholic score, suggesting the passage of time and contributing to the unease that builds up to the inevitable yet unsettling climax.

Music

The music for the film was composed by Australian musicians Nick Cave and Warren Ellis who had collaborated previously to create the award-winning score for the Australian film The Proposition (2005).

Nick Cave has a minor part in the latter part of the film. He plays a strolling balladeer in a crowded bar performing "The Ballad of Jesse James", a folk song which describes Robert Ford as a coward, unaware that Ford himself is present.

Cave and Ellis released a double disc album titled White Lunar in September 2009, which contains several tracks from the Jesse James score, as well as tracks they composed for other films up to 2009.

Release
The Assassination of Jesse James by the Coward Robert Ford was originally slated a release date for September 15, 2006. The release date was postponed to February 2007 at first, but ultimately set for a September 21, 2007 release, almost two years after filming was completed.

The film opened in limited release on September 21, 2007, in five theaters and grossed $147,812 in its opening weekend, an average of $29,256 per theater. The film has a total gross of less than $4 million.

Warner Home Video released the film on DVD on February 5, 2008 in the US, and on March 31 in the UK. So far, about 566,537 DVD units have been sold, bringing $9,853,258 in revenue.

Reception

Critical reception

The film received positive reviews and garnered a wide range of awards. On Rotten Tomatoes, the film has an approval rating of 77% based on 175 reviews, with an average rating of 7.16/10. The site's critical consensus reads, "On the strength of its two lead performances Assassination is an expertly crafted period piece, and an insightful look at one of the enduring figures of American lore." On Metacritic, the film has a score of 68 out of 100, based on 32 critics, indicating "generally favorable reviews".

Brian Tallerico of UGO gave the film an "A" and said that it is "the best western since Unforgiven." Tallerico also said, "Stunning visuals, award-worthy performances, and a script that takes incredibly rewarding risks, Jesse James is a masterpiece and one of the best films of the year." Kurt Loder of MTV said, "If I were inclined to wheel out clichés like 'Oscar-worthy', I'd certainly wheel them out in support of this movie, on several counts."

Richard Roeper on the television show Ebert & Roeper said, "If you love classic and stylish mood Westerns such as McCabe and Mrs. Miller and The Long Riders, this is your film." Roger Ebert noted the "curiously erotic dance of death" between James and the "mesmerized" younger Ford. Finally, he said, "If Robert cannot be the lover of his hero, what would be more intimate than to kill him?" He notes that it has the "space and freedom" of classic Western epics, where "the land is so empty, it creates a vacuum demanding men to become legends."

The Star-Ledger film critic Stephen Whitty gave the film four stars and called it an "epic film that's part literary treatise, part mournful ballad, and completely a portrait of our world, as seen in a distant mirror." Whitty also said that the film is "far superior" and "truer to its own world" than 3:10 to Yuma. Josh Rosenblatt of The Austin Chronicle gave the film 3.5 stars and said the film "grabs on to many of the classic tropes of the Western – the meandering passage of time, the imposing landscapes, the abiding loneliness, the casual violence – and sets about mapping their furthest edges."

Film critic Emanuel Levy gave the film an "A" and wrote, "Alongside Joel and Ethan Coen's No Country for Old Men, which is a Western in disguise, or rather a modern Western, Assassination of Jesse James is the second masterpiece of the season." Levy also wrote, "Like Bonnie & Clyde, Dominik's seminal Western is a brilliant, poetic saga of America's legendary criminal as well as meditative deconstruction of our culture's most persistent issues: link of crime and fame, myths of heroism and obsession with celebrity." Lewis Beale of Film Journal International said "Impeccably shot, cast and directed, this is a truly impressive film from sophomore writer-director Andrew Dominik... but suffers from an unfortunate case of elephantiasis." Beale said Affleck is "outstanding in a breakout performance" and said Pitt is "scary and charismatic." Beale wrote, "The director seems so in love with his languorous pacing, he's incapable of cutting the five or ten seconds in any number of scenes that could have given the film a more manageable running time. In the scheme of things, however, this amounts to little more than a quibble." Beale said that ultimately, the film is "a fascinating, literary-based work that succeeds as both art and genre film."

Critic Mark Kermode named the film as his best of 2007 in his end-of-year review on Simon Mayo's BBC radio programme. Kermode later wrote that historians a hundred years from now will consider it "one of the most wrongly neglected masterpieces of its era."

Many critics opined that the film is too long. Kirk Honeycutt of The Hollywood Reporter said that the relationship between Pitt and Affleck "gets smothered in pointlessly long takes, repetitive scenes, grim Western landscapes and mumbled, heavily accented dialogue." Los Angeles Daily News critic Bob Strauss gave the film 2.5 stars out of 4 and said, "To put it most bluntly, the thing is just too long and too slow." Strauss also said, "Every element of this Western is beautifully rendered. So why is it a chore to sit through?" Pam Grady of Reel.com gave the film 2 stars out of 4 and said, "The movie is merely a long, empty exercise in style." Stephanie Zacharek of Salon.com said that the film "represents a breakthrough in the moviegoing experience. It may be the first time we've been asked to watch a book on tape."

Peter Bradshaw's review in The Guardian noted James's contribution to his own demise as well as the apparent paradox in the title of both novel and film:

Bradshaw took issue with the narration that often redundantly describes action clearly visible to the viewer on the screen. "The only false note is the use of a supercilious third-person narrative voiceover, which smudges the picture's crispness and clarity."

During a post-screening Q & A at the movie's "revival" in 2013, Dominik reported that when he showed Terrence Malick a cut of Jesse James, his reaction was "it's too slow," drawing a laugh from the audience.

Top ten lists
The film appeared on many critics' top ten lists of the best films of 2007.

Accolades

The Assassination of Jesse James by the Coward Robert Ford was identified by the National Board of Review of Motion Pictures as one of the top 10 films of 2007. The board also named Casey Affleck as Best Supporting Actor in the film. The San Francisco Film Critics Circle named The Assassination of Jesse James by the Coward Robert Ford as the Best Picture of 2007. The circle also awarded Affleck as best supporting actor for the film. Affleck was nominated for Best Performance by an Actor in a Supporting Role in a Motion Picture for the 65th Golden Globe Awards.

The film received two Academy Award nominations for the 80th Academy Awards. Affleck was nominated for Best Supporting Actor and Roger Deakins was nominated for Best Cinematography. Earlier in the year, Brad Pitt won the prestigious Volpi Cup for Best Actor when the film premiered at the annual Venice Film Festival. Several other awards circles also awarded composers Nick Cave and Warren Ellis for their music in the film (see below).

The film also holds a place on Empire'''s recent list of The 500 Greatest Films of All Time'', coming in at #396. In 2016, it was voted the 92nd best film since 2000 in an international critics' poll.

References

External links

 
 
 
 
 
 
 Official website for the Family of Jesse James with the James Family's Own Movie Review 
 DVD review, from DVDCompare

2007 Western (genre) films
2007 biographical drama films
2007 drama films
2007 films
Biographical films about Jesse James
Films about assassinations
Films about bank robbery
Films based on American novels
Films based on Western (genre) novels
Films directed by Andrew Dominik
Films produced by Brad Pitt
Films produced by David Valdes
Films scored by Nick Cave
Films scored by Warren Ellis (musician)
Films set in 1881
Films set in 1882
Films set in Missouri
Films shot in Edmonton
Films shot in Winnipeg
Plan B Entertainment films
Revisionist Western (genre) films
Warner Bros. films
2000s English-language films
2000s American films